The UEFA Euro 1976 quarter-finals was the last round of qualifying competition for UEFA Euro 1976. It was contested by the eight group winners from the previous round of qualifying. The winners of each of four home-and-away ties qualified for the finals tournament in Yugoslavia. The matches were played on 24–25 April and 22 May 1976.

Qualification

Each group winner progressed to the quarter-finals. The quarter-finals were played in two legs on a home-and-away basis. The winners of the quarter-finals would go through to the final tournament.

Summary

|}

Matches
The eight matches took place over two legs, the first being on 24 and 25 April 1976, and the second on 22 May 1976. All times are CET (UTC+1).

Yugoslavia won 3–1 on aggregate.

Czechoslovakia won 4–2 on aggregate.

West Germany won 3–1 on aggregate.

Netherlands won 7–1 on aggregate.

Goalscorers

References

External links
UEFA Euro 1976 qualifying

Play-offs
1975–76 in Yugoslav football
1975–76 in Welsh football
1975–76 in Czechoslovak football
1976 in Soviet football
1975–76 in Spanish football
West Germany at UEFA Euro 1976
1975–76 in German football
Netherlands at UEFA Euro 1976
1975–76 in Dutch football
1975–76 in Belgian football
Czechoslovakia at UEFA Euro 1976
Yugoslavia at UEFA Euro 1976